George Andrew Webb (born 1 May 1991) is an English footballer who plays for Wimborne Town, as a midfielder.

Career
Born in Poole, Webb began his career with Bournemouth, moving on loan to Dorchester Town in March 2009. He made his senior debut for Bournemouth in the Football League on 2 May 2009, in the last game of the 2008–09 season. He was released by Bournemouth on 27 October 2009, having made four appearances for the club in all competitions, and signed for Gosport Borough on a free transfer a day later. He later signed for Bournemouth Poppies, making his debut in December 2009. Webb moved to Hamworthy United in December 2010, and to Wimborne Town in May 2011.

References

1991 births
Living people
English footballers
AFC Bournemouth players
Gosport Borough F.C. players
Bournemouth F.C. players
Hamworthy United F.C. players
Wimborne Town F.C. players
English Football League players
Association football midfielders